Whitefish Lake 6 is a reserve in Ontario, Canada.  It is inhabited by the Ojibwa Atikameksheng Anishnawbek First Nation.

It is immediately south of the community of Naughton in Greater Sudbury, and is considered part of Greater Sudbury's Census Metropolitan Area. In the Canada 2011 Census, the community of Whitefish Lake had a population of 394 living on the reserve. It is bordered by both Greater Sudbury and the Unorganized North Sudbury District.

In 2010, the community was selected as the host community for Building Homes and Building Skills, a project by television personality Mike Holmes to train First Nations people in construction and building trades.

Notable members 
 Loma Lyns, singer and songwriter

References

External links
 Map of Whitefish Lake 6 at Statcan

Anishinaabe reserves in Ontario
Communities in Sudbury District